These are the official results of the Women's Heptathlon competition at the 1984 Summer Olympics in Los Angeles, California.

Abbreviations

Final standings

See also
1980 Women's Olympic Pentathlon (Moscow)
1982 Women's European Championship Heptathlon (Athens)
1983 Women's World Championship Heptathlon (Helsinki)
1984 Women's Friendship Games Heptathlon (Prague)
1986 Women's European Championship Heptathlon (Stuttgart)
1987 Women's World Championship Heptathlon (Rome)
1988 Women's Olympic Heptathlon (Seoul)

References

External links
  Results
  olympic.neostrada

Heptathlon
1984
1984 in women's athletics
Women's events at the 1984 Summer Olympics